William J. McCoy (March 15, 1848 – 1926)  was an American composer.  Born in Ohio, he wrote chamber music, some pieces for orchestra (including a symphony in F premiered in 1872), an opera, incidental music for plays, and choral works including a mass in D minor.  He was active for a time in San Francisco, California.

References

1848 births
1926 deaths
19th-century American composers
19th-century classical composers
20th-century classical composers
American male classical composers
American opera composers
Male opera composers
American Romantic composers
20th-century American composers
Classical musicians from Ohio
20th-century American male musicians
19th-century American male musicians